The World Federation of Vietnam Vocotruyen (WFVV) was founded in 2015. The WFVV organizes Vocotruyen World Championships every two years. and Vocotruyen World cup

References 

Martial arts